Cassida sareptana is a species of brownish beetle in the leaf beetle family, found in Kazakhstan, Mongolia, Russia and Ukraine. They can be found in Near East as well. The species feeds on plants from the family Asteraceae, including tarragon and Artemisia arenaria.

References

Cassidinae
Beetles described in 1874
Beetles of Asia
Taxa named by Ernst Gustav Kraatz